Tournefortia ramosissima is a species of plant in the family Boraginaceae. It is endemic to Ecuador.  Its natural habitat is subtropical or tropical moist montane forests. It is threatened by habitat loss.

References

ramosissima
Endemic flora of Ecuador
Near threatened flora of South America
Taxonomy articles created by Polbot